The Man Who Forgot may refer to:

 The Man Who Forgot (1917 film)
 The Man Who Forgot (1919 film)
 The Man Who Forgot (1927 film)